Morten Sundli (born 31 March 1990) is a Norwegian footballer who plays for Ullensaker/Kisa.

He started his youth career in Roterud, and played youth and senior football for FF Lillehammer before being signed by Odds BK ahead of the 2009 season.

Career statistics

References

1990 births
Living people
Sportspeople from Lillehammer
Norwegian footballers
Odds BK players
Mjøndalen IF players
Sarpsborg 08 FF players
Eliteserien players
Östers IF players
Ullensaker/Kisa IL players
Norwegian First Division players
Superettan players
Association football defenders